Trophocosta maculifera is a species of moth of the family Tortricidae. It is found in Vietnam.

Adults are similar to Trophocosta tucki, and may even be its junior synonym.

References

Moths described in 1992
Tortricini